Kavaru ( may refer to:
 Kavaru, Bam (كوارو - Kavārū)